Solnechnoye is a rural locality (a selo) and the administrative center of Solnechny Selsoviet, Pervomaysky District, Altai Krai, Russia. The population was 477 as of 2013. There are 30 streets.

Geography 
Solnechnoye is located 8 km east of Novoaltaysk (the district's administrative centre) by road. Novy is the nearest rural locality.

References 

Rural localities in Pervomaysky District, Altai Krai